Ronald Andres Jiménez Zamora (born 9 January 1990) is a Colombian volleyball player who plays for AS Cannes and the Colombian national volleyball team.

Sporting achievements

Club
 2013–14  Austrian Cup, with Hypo Tirol Innsbruck
 2013–14  Austrian Championship, with Hypo Tirol Innsbruck
 2017–18  French Cup, with Tourcoing LM

Individual awards
 2015: CSV South American Championship – Best Outside Spiker

References

External links

 
 Player profile at PlusLiga.pl 
 Player profile at Volleybox.net

1990 births
Living people
Sportspeople from Cali
Colombian men's volleyball players
Colombian expatriate sportspeople in Finland
Expatriate volleyball players in Finland
Colombian expatriate sportspeople in Greece
Expatriate volleyball players in Greece
Colombian expatriate sportspeople in Austria
Expatriate volleyball players in Austria
Colombian expatriate sportspeople in France
Expatriate volleyball players in France
Colombian expatriate sportspeople in Poland
Expatriate volleyball players in Poland
Colombian expatriate sportspeople in South Korea
Expatriate volleyball players in South Korea
Olympiacos S.C. players
Cuprum Lubin players
Cheonan Hyundai Capital Skywalkers players
AS Cannes Volley-Ball players
Opposite hitters